Paralacydes fiorii is a moth of the family Erebidae. It was described by Emilio Berio in 1937. It is found in Kenya, Somalia and Tanzania.

References

Spilosomina
Moths described in 1937